Events from the year 1969 in Belgium

Incumbents
Monarch: Baudouin
Prime Minister: Gaston Eyskens

Events

Publications
 Frank Edward Huggett, Modern Belgium (New York, Praeger)

Births

Deaths
 19 January – Henri Carton de Tournai (born 1878), politician

References

 
Belgium
Years of the 20th century in Belgium
1960s in Belgium
Belgium